Gilchrist County is a county located in the north central part of the U.S. state of Florida. Organized in 1925 from the western part of Alachua, it is the last county to be formed in the state. As of the 2020 census, the population was 17,864. The county seat is Trenton.

Gilchrist County is included in the Gainesville, FL Metropolitan Statistical Area.

History
Gilchrist County was created in 1925, the last county organized in Florida. It was named for Albert W. Gilchrist, Governor of Florida from 1909 to 1913. It was formed by residents of what was then western Alachua County, as they believed they were not getting adequate representation on the county commission. With the poor roads of the time, they felt it took too long to get to the county seat of Gainesville. They disagreed about a proposed law that would require fencing in cattle in the rural area. They also believed that they would be better off by getting their own share of racetrack revenues, which the state distributed by county.

Much of the county was farmland and timberland when formed, and it is largely rural. Several natural springs are adjacent to the Santa Fe River, including Ginnie Springs, Hart Springs, and Gilchrist Blue Springs, the last of which became a Florida state park in 2017.

Historic buildings
Historic buildings in Gilchrist County include:
 First Baptist Church, on East Wade Street
 Gilchrist County Courthouse
 Trenton Depot
 Jennings Lake Seventh-Day Adventist Church
 The old Trenton Church of Christ on South Main Street.
 Gilchrist County Jail, built in 1926, operated from 1928 to 1968.

Geography
It is the fifth-smallest county in Florida by land area and fourth-smallest by total area.

Adjacent counties
 Columbia County, Florida – northeast
 Alachua County, Florida – east
 Levy County, Florida – south
 Dixie County, Florida – southwest
 Suwannee County, Florida – northwest
 Lafayette County, Florida – northwest

Demographics

As of the 2020 United States census, there were 17,864 people, 6,701 households, and 4,463 families residing in the county.

As of the census of 2000, there were 14,437 people, 5,021 households, and 3,715 families residing in the county. There were 5,906 housing units at an average density of 17 per square mile (7/km2). The racial makeup of the county was 90.52% White, 7.00% Black or African American, 0.37% Native American, 0.17% Asian, 0.01% Pacific Islander, 0.69% from other races, and 1.26% from two or more races.  2.80% of the population were Hispanic or Latino of any race. In terms of ancestry, 16.9% were English, 13.9% were Irish, 13.7% were American, and 11.4% were German.

There were 5,021 households, out of which 32.90% had children under the age of 18 living with them, 59.00% were married couples living together, 11.20% had a female householder with no husband present, and 26.00% were non-families. 21.10% of all households were made up of individuals, and 8.70% had someone living alone who was 65 years of age or older.  The average household size was 2.61 and the average family size was 3.01.

In the county, the population was spread out, with 24.40% under the age of 18, 14.20% from 18 to 24, 24.80% from 25 to 44, 22.90% from 45 to 64, and 13.60% who were 65 years of age or older.  The median age was 35 years. For every 100 females, there were 112.50 males.  For every 100 females age 18 and over, there were 115.10 males.

The median income for a household in the county was $30,328, and the median income for a family was $34,485. Males had a median income of $27,359 versus $21,946 for females. The per capita income for the county was $13,985.  About 10.90% of families and 14.10% of the population were below the poverty line, including 17.60% of those under age 18 and 12.90% of those age 65 or over.

Economy
The Trenton State Farmer's Market is located on State Road 47, north of Trenton.

Politics

Voter registration
According to the Secretary of State's office, Republicans maintain a majority of registered voters in Gilchrist County.

Statewide elections

Library
The Gilchrist County Public library is part of the Three Rivers Regional Library System, which also serves Dixie, Lafayette, and Taylor counties.

Communities

Cities
 Fanning Springs (shared with Levy County)
 Trenton

Town
 Bell

Census-designated places
 Spring Ridge

Other unincorporated communities
 Wilcox
 Wilcox Junction

Notable people
Easton Corbin, country music singer

Dallas Creamer, youtuber and podcaster

See also 
 National Register of Historic Places listings in Gilchrist County, Florida

Notes

References

External links

Government links/Constitutional offices
 Gilchrist County Board of County Commissioners
 Gilchrist County Supervisor of Elections
 Gilchrist County Property Appraiser 
 Gilchrist County Sheriff's Office 
 Gilchrist County Tax Collector

Special districts
 Gilchrist County Public Schools
 Suwannee River Water Management District [Dead link 26 August 2016]

Judicial branch
 Gilchrist County Clerk of Courts
 Office of the State Attorney, 8th Judicial Circuit of Florida  serving Alachua, Baker, Bradford, Gilchrist, Levy and Union Counties
 Circuit and County Court for the 8th Judicial Circuit of Florida

Museum and Library Resources

 The Gilchrist County Journal, the local newspaper for Gilchrist County, Florida fully and openly available in the Florida Digital Newspaper Library

 
Florida counties
1925 establishments in Florida
Gainesville metropolitan area, Florida
North Florida
Populated places established in 1925